The Para Sport - Women's shot put (F32–34/52/53) at the 2010 Commonwealth Games as part of the athletics programme was held at the Jawaharlal Nehru Stadium on Wednesday 6 October 2010.

Results

External links
2010 Commonwealth Games - Athletics

Women's shot put (F32-34 52 53)
2010 in women's athletics